This is a list of main career statistics of Belgian professional tennis player David Goffin. All statistics are according to the ATP Tour and ITF websites.

Performance timelines

Singles
Current through the 2023 Marseille Open.

Significant finals

Year-end championships

Singles: 1 (1 runner-up)

ATP Masters 1000

Singles: 1 (1 runner up)

ATP career finals

Singles: 15 (6 titles, 9 runner-ups)

Doubles: 1 (1 title)

ATP Challenger and ITF Futures finals

Singles: 19 (14–6)

Doubles: 4 (2–2)

Best Grand Slam results details

Record against other players

Head-to-head record against top-10 players
Goffin's record against players who have been ranked in the top 10. Active players are in boldface:

Head-to-head record against players ranked No. 11–20
Head-to-head record against all players who have a career-high singles ranking of 11–20 in the world. Active players are highlighted in bold.

  Borna Ćorić 5–0
  Frances Tiafoe 5–1
  Guido Pella 4–1
  Andreas Seppi 3–0
  Hyeon Chung 3–1
  Feliciano López 3–1
  Viktor Troicki 3–1
  Benoît Paire 3–3
  Nikoloz Basilashvili 2–0
  Marco Cecchinato 2–1
  Marcel Granollers 2–1
  Jerzy Janowicz 2–1
  Ivo Karlović 2–1
  Philipp Kohlschreiber 2–1
  Reilly Opelka 2–1
  Sam Querrey 2–1
  Florian Mayer 2–2
  Cristian Garín 1–0
  Aslan Karatsev 1–0
  Xavier Malisse 1–0
  Paul-Henri Mathieu 1–0
  Alexandr Dolgopolov 1–1
  Kyle Edmund 1–1
  Taylor Fritz 1–1
  Jarkko Nieminen 1–1
  Albert Ramos Viñolas 1–1
  Bernard Tomic 1–2
  Nick Kyrgios 1–3
  Pablo Cuevas 0–1
  Dmitry Tursunov 0–2
  Alex de Minaur 0–4

*

Top-10 wins per season 
He has a  record against players who were, at the time the match was played, ranked in the top 10.

Team competitions finals

Davis Cup: 2 (2 runner-ups)

References

External links

Goffin, David